Gilad Bloom and Javier Sánchez were the defending champions, but none competed this year. Sánchez opted to compete at Schenectady during the same week.

David Prinosil and Richard Vogel won the title by defeating Sander Groen and Lars Koslowski 6–3, 6–7, 7–6 in the final.

Seeds

Draw

Draw

References

External links
 Official results archive (ATP)
 Official results archive (ITF)

Croatia Open - Doubles
1992 Doubles
1992 in Croatian tennis